Brasiliense Futebol Clube, commonly referred to as Brasiliense, is a Brazilian professional club based in Taguatinga, Distrito Federal founded on 1 August 2000. It competes in the Campeonato Brasileiro Série D, the fourth tier of Brazilian football, as well as in the Campeonato Brasiliense, the top flight of the Distrito Federal state football league.

History
The club was founded on 1 August 2000 with the involvement of the CNPJ of Atlântida Esporte Clube by Luís Estêvão.

Brasiliense managed to establish records in the Federal District and in Brazil during its short history. The club became the youngest finalist of a Copa do Brasil in its first participation, in 2002. It was the first and only team of the Federal District to dispute a national title in the elite of football. After eliminating traditional opponents like Náutico, Fluminense and Atlético Mineiro, they were runners-up in the final against Corinthians.

The club won its first national title in 2002, the Brazilian third division. Two years later, it achieved its greatest victory to date by winning the Brazilian second division. In addition, Brasiliense has eight state titles and one of the second state division.

Symbols
The colors of Brasiliense Futebol Clube are green, yellow and white, in reference to the colors of the flag of the Federal District. The official mascot is the Alligator. The flag is composed of three bands in yellow and two in white with the official shield superimposed. The anthem was composed by Walter Queiroz and the first uniform always included shirts, shorts and yellow socks. In 2008 a cross was introduced in the uniform also in reference to the flag of the Federal District.

Rivalries

Team rivals are Gama and Brasília. The biggest rival is Gama, the clubs of the Federal District that have achieved the greatest national achievements, both have won the Campeonato Brasileiro Série B. In addition, the most popular clubs among the candangos (generic term used for the construction workers employed during the construction of Brasilia), the derby Verde-Amarelo (Green-Yellow), as it is called. The derby attracts significant crowds.

Stadium

Brasiliense's stadium is Elmo Serejo Farias (Serejão), which has a capacity of 28,000. The stadium is named after Elmo Serejo Farias, who was Taguatinga's administrator and Distrito Federal's governor during the stadium construction. They also play in Estádio Nacional Mané Garrincha.

Players

Current squad

Honours
 Campeonato Brasileiro Série B
 Winners (1): 2004

 Campeonato Brasileiro Série C
 Winners (1): 2002

 Copa Verde
 Winners (1): 2020

 Campeonato Brasiliense
 Winners (11): 2004, 2005, 2006, 2007, 2008, 2009, 2011, 2013, 2017, 2021, 2022

 Campeonato Brasiliense Second Division
 Winners (1): 2000

References

External links
 Official Site

Association football clubs established in 2000
Brasiliense Futebol Clube
Football clubs in Federal District (Brazil)
2000 establishments in Brazil
Campeonato Brasileiro Série B winners
Campeonato Brasileiro Série C winners
Copa Verde winners